The ICC World Test Championship is a league competition for Test cricket run by the International Cricket Council (ICC), which started on 1 August 2019. It is intended to be the premier championship for Test cricket. It is in line with the ICC's goal of having one pinnacle tournament for each of the three formats of international cricket.

The original plans to hold the competition in 2009, replacing the 2013 ICC Champions Trophy, were abandoned. It was rescheduled for June 2017, with a second Test championship to take place in India in Feb-March 2021. The top four ranked teams on 31 December 2016 – the cut-off date set by the ICC – would play the three-match Test championship. There would have been two semi-finals and the winners play the final. However, in January 2014 the ICC World Test Championship was cancelled and the 2017 ICC Champions Trophy was reinstated.

In October 2017, the ICC announced that a Test league had been agreed upon by its members, which would involve the top nine teams playing series over two years with the top two teams qualifying for a World Test League Championship Final, which will be considered as an ICC event. The league games of WTC were not considered as an ICC event and the broadcasting rights were with the host nation’s cricketing board itself and not with ICC. But unlike the league stage matches, the WTC finals were considered to be an ICC event. The first ICC World Test Championship started with the 2019 Ashes series, and finished with New Zealand lifting the trophy after defeating India in the final in June 2021. The second ICC World Test Championship started on 4 August 2021 with the Pataudi Trophy series.

History

Cancelled 2013 tournament
This championship was first proposed in 2009, when the ICC met the MCC to discuss a proposed Test match championship. Former New Zealand captain Martin Crowe was one of the main brains behind this proposal.

In July 2010 ICC chief executive Haroon Lorgat suggested a quadrennial tournament with the four best-ranked nations meeting in the semi-finals and a final, in a bid to boost flagging interest in the longest form of the sport. The first tournament was meant to replace the 2013 ICC Champions Trophy in England and Wales.

The idea of a Test championship was considered by the ICC Chief Executives' Committee at a meeting at their headquarters in Dubai in mid-September 2010.  ICC spokesperson Colin Gibson said that much more would be revealed after the meeting, and that if the championship was held in England, then the favoured final venue would be Lord's. As expected, the ICC approved the plan and said that the first tournament would be held in England and Wales in 2013. The format of the tournament was also announced. It would comprise an inaugural league stage, played over a period of four years, with all ten current Test cricket nations (Australia, India, England, South Africa, Pakistan, Sri Lanka, New Zealand, West Indies, Zimbabwe, and Bangladesh) participating. After the league stage the top four teams will take part in the play-offs, with the final determining the Test cricket champions.

There was a debate as to whether the play-off would take place between the top 8 teams or the top four teams, but the latter was unanimously chosen by the board. It was also announced that the tournament would replace the ICC Champions Trophy. No decision had been made concerning how to decide the outcome of drawn matches in the knock-out stages.

However, in 2011, the ICC announced that the Test Championship would not take place until 2017, and that the 2013 tournament would be cancelled because of financial problems within the board, and its commitment to its sponsors and broadcasters. England and Wales, the original hosts of this cancelled tournament were awarded the 2013 ICC Champions Trophy instead, the tournament that the Test Championship was intended to replace. This drew widespread criticism; both Greg Chappell and Graeme Smith criticised the ICC, saying that postponing the Test Championship was wrong and unjustified. The Guardian reported that this postponement was a blow to Lord's, which had been expected to host the final.

Cancelled 2017 tournament

At the ICC Chief Executives' meeting in April 2012, it was confirmed that the ICC Champions Trophy would be last held in 2013 with the inaugural Test Championship play-offs being scheduled for June 2017. The ICC said that there would be only one trophy for each format of the game, which meant that the Champions Trophy would no longer take place since the Cricket World Cup is the premier event for 50-over cricket.

The final would possibly have followed the historical timeless test format. Further improvements in the structure of the championship have also been discussed.

However, in January 2014 the 2017 ICC World Test Championship was cancelled and the 2017 ICC Champions Trophy was reinstated.

2019–21 tournament

The first tournament began with the 2019 Ashes series. In March 2020, matches were suspended due to the COVID-19 pandemic, not resuming before July 2020, with several rounds of matches being postponed or ultimately cancelled. New Zealand became the first team to qualify for the final, when it was confirmed that the series between South Africa and Australia would not proceed, followed by India. The inaugural World Test Championship Final was played between India and New Zealand from 18–23 June 2021 at Rose Bowl, Southampton, England. Despite the opening and fourth day of the final being washed out by rain, New Zealand managed to win in the final session of the reserve day and lifted the first World Test Championship trophy.

2021–23 tournament

The WTC 2021–23 cycle began in August 2021 with Pataudi Trophy (5 matches series between India and England). The International Cricket Council officially announced the full programme with a new points system. Australia qualified for the final by winning the 3rd Test Match of the 2022–23 Border-Gavaskar Trophy. India qualified after Sri Lanka failed to win the first match of their series in New Zealand. The final is scheduled to play on 7 June to 11 June 2023 at The Oval, London, England.

2023–25 tournament 

The WTC 2023–25 cycle will begin with the 1st Ashes Test on 16th June 2023. The International Cricket Council officially announced that the WTC final will be played at Lord's in the summer of 2025.

Results

Team performances

An overview of all the Test playing nations' performances:

Key:

Tournament records

See also
 Asian Test Championship
 2005 ICC Super Series

References

External links 
 ICC World Test Championship ESPN Cricinfo

 
Test, World
World Test Championship
Test cricket competitions